Howard J. Wetters is a former Democratic politician from Michigan who served in the Michigan House of Representatives representing northern Bay County for most of the 1990s. Wetters also unsuccessfully ran for Bay County Clerk in 2012, challenging the incumbent Cynthia A. Luczak.

References

Democratic Party members of the Michigan House of Representatives
People from Bay County, Michigan
Michigan State University alumni
Living people
1952 births
20th-century American politicians